The 2017 Eschborn–Frankfurt – Rund um den Finanzplatz was a road cycling one-day race that took place, as customary on Tag der Arbeit (Labour Day), 1 May in Germany. It was the 56th edition (55th to be held) of the Eschborn–Frankfurt – Rund um den Finanzplatz and the twentieth event of the 2017 UCI World Tour. It was the race's first appearance on the World Tour calendar.

The race was won by 's Alexander Kristoff after a strong lead-out from teammate Rick Zabel; Kristoff finished several lengths ahead of the next closest competitor, taking his third victory at the race, matching the record of Erik Zabel, Rick's father. Rick Zabel was able to finish in second place, while the podium was completed by another German rider, John Degenkolb, for the  team.

Route
The race started in Eschborn and finished in Frankfurt, traveling through the Taunus mid-mountain range northwest of Frankfurt. The main difficulties are the climbs of the Feldberg, Ruppershain and Mammolshain.

Teams
As a new event to the UCI World Tour, all UCI WorldTeams were invited to the race, but not obligated to compete in the race. As such, eleven of the eighteen WorldTeams elected to compete. Eight UCI Professional Continental teams competed, and a German national team completed the 20-team peloton.

Result

References

Sources

External links

2017 UCI World Tour
2017 in German sport
2017
May 2017 sports events in Germany